The House of Jabłonowski is a Polish szlachta (nobility) family.

History

The history of the family starts in the 16th century when members of the Wichulski family purchased the Jabłonowo Pomorskie estate and began to use the name Jabłonowski. The family rose to prominence in the 17th century with Stanisław Jan Jabłonowski, a successful military leader in such campaigns as that against the Swedes during The Deluge, Chocim, the 1683 Battle of Vienna and the 1695 battle against the Tatars at Lwów. During the 1696 election to select a successor for John III Sobieski, Stanisław Jan Jabłonowski was a candidate for the Polish throne. In 1698, Emperor Leopold I granted him and his family the hereditary title of Prince.

Stanisław Jan Jabłonowski was the father of Anna Jabłonowska who was the mother of Polish King Stanisław Leszczyński.  Stanisław Leszczyński's daughter Marie Leszczyńska married King Louis XV of France and became, with him, the ancestress of most of the Roman Catholic monarchs of Europe.

Coat of arms and motto

The Jabłonowski family used the Prus III coat of arms.

Selected family members

Stanisław Jan Jabłonowski (1634–1702), Field and Great Hetman of the Crown
Anna Jabłonowska (1660–1727), mother of King  Stanisław I Leszczyński
Marianna Jabłonowska (1708–1765), married to Jan Wielopolski
Aleksander Jan Jabłonowski (?-1733), Great Chorąży
Józef Aleksander Jabłonowski (1711–1777), Stolnik, voivode
Antoni Barnaba Jabłonowski (1732–1799), voiode, castellan
Dorota Barbara Jabłonowska (1760–1844), married to Józef Klemens Czartoryski
Władysław Franciszek Jabłonowski (1769–1802), Polish and French general.

See also
 Jabłonowski

Gallery

References